A massacre is the deliberate slaughter of members of one group by one or more members of another more powerful group. A massacre may be indiscriminate or highly methodical in application. A massacre is a single event, though it may occur during the course of an extended military campaign or war. A massacre is separate from a battle (an event in which opposing sides fight), but may follow in its immediate aftermath, when one side has surrendered or lost the ability to fight, yet the victors persist in killing their opponents.

Pre-colonial India

Colonial India

Independent India

See also
Religious violence in India
Violence against Muslims in India
Madhe Sahaba Agitation
Violence against Christians in India
Persecution of Hindus
Caste-related violence in India
List of wars involving India
List of battles of Rajasthan
List of riots in India
1925 Indian riots
List of riots in Mumbai
Terrorism in India
List of terrorist incidents in India

References

India
Massacres

massacres